Fat Friends (also known as Kay Mellor’s Fat Friends) is a British drama that aired on ITV from 12 October 2000 to 24 March 2005, consisting of 25 episodes over four series. Set in Leeds, the series explores the lives of several slimming club members, with a focus on the various ways their weight has impacted upon them.

The series was created by Kay Mellor and made by Rollem Productions in association with Tiger Aspect Productions and Yorkshire Television. Four of the cast – Ruth Jones, James Corden, Sheridan Smith and Alison Steadman – went on to appear in the sitcom Gavin & Stacey. Jonathan Ryland who played Kevin, the husband to Ruth Jones' character also appeared in Gavin and Stacey as the celebrant who presided when Pete and Dawn renewed their wedding vows.

Premise
Fat Friends is set around a slimming club in the Headingley district of Leeds. The club is run by the formidable Carol (Janet Dibley), who fruitlessly tries to persuade the members of the group to follow the "Super Slimmers" diet. The characters who attend the club are from varied backgrounds and of varied weight.  Whilst some plots continue throughout all four series, each episode focuses on one particular character.

Main cast and characters
Alison Steadman as Betty Simpson
Gaynor Faye as Lauren Harris
Ruth Jones as Kelly Chadwick (née Simpson)
Jonathan Ryland as Kevin Chadwick
James Corden as Jamie Rymer
Janet Dibley as Carol McGary
Richard Ridings as Alan Ashburn (series 1 and 2)
Kathryn Hunt as Val Lorrimer (series 1 and 2)
Lisa Riley as Rebecca Patterson (series 2–4)
Lynda Baron as Norma Patterson (series 2–4)

Episodes

Series overview

Series 1 (2000)

Series 2 (2002)

Series 3 (2004)

Series 4 (2005)

Ratings

Awards and nominations
British Academy Television Award
 Best Actress for Alison Steadman – Nominated
 Best Drama Series for Kay Mellor & Greg Brenman & David Reynolds – Nominated
Royal Television Society Programme Awards
 On-Screen Network Newcomer for James Corden – Nominated
TV Quick Awards
 Best New Drama – Won
Television and Radio Industries Club Awards
 TV Drama Programme – Won

Home media
Region 2

A VHS of the first series was released on 24 June 2002. The first three series of Fat Friends have been released on DVD in the United Kingdom via Sony Pictures Home Entertainment.

 Fat Friends: Series One (released 21 March 2005)
 Fat Friends: Series Two (released 18 April 2005)
 Fat Friends: Series Three (released 18 April 2005)
 Fat Friends: The Complete Series 1, 2 & 3 (released 21 March 2005)

Region 1
 Fat Friends: Season One (released 13 February 2007)

Stage musical adaptation

A stage musical adaptation of the series directed and written by original creator, Kay Mellor, with music by Nicholas Lloyd Webber made its world premiere at the Grand Theatre in Leeds on 7 November 2017 before embarking on a UK tour, starring Jodie Prenger as Kelly Stevenson.

References

External links

 
 

2000 British television series debuts
2005 British television series endings
2000s British comedy-drama television series
ITV television dramas
Television series by ITV Studios
ITV comedy
Television series by Banijay
Television shows set in Leeds
Television shows set in Yorkshire
Television series by Yorkshire Television
Television series by Tiger Aspect Productions
English-language television shows